Abdoul Khadre Mbaye Niane (born 20 August 1988) is a Senegalese swimmer. He competed in the men's 50 metre freestyle event at the 2016 Summer Olympics.

Major results

Individual

Long course

Relay

Long course

References

External links
 

1988 births
Living people
Senegalese male swimmers
Olympic swimmers of Senegal
Swimmers at the 2016 Summer Olympics
Place of birth missing (living people)
Competitors at the 2011 All-Africa Games
Swimmers at the 2015 African Games
Swimmers at the 2019 African Games
African Games competitors for Senegal